Jazmon Gwathmey (born 24 January 1993) is a Puerto Rican professional basketball player for Lointek Gernika Bizkaia of the Liga Femenina de Baloncesto. She played for Indiana Fever of the Women's National Basketball Association (WNBA).

Career

College
Gwathmey averaged 11.4 points, 5.4 rebounds and 1.3 blocks in four seasons at James Madison. She is a three-time Colonial Athletic Association Player of the Year and CAA tournament Most Outstanding Player winning the awards in 2014, 2015 and 2016.

Statistics
Source

WNBA
Gwathmey was drafted 14th overall in the second round by the Minnesota Lynx in the 2016 WNBA draft. Gwathmey was later traded to the San Antonio Stars in exchange for guard Jia Perkins. In 2017, Gwathmey was traded to the Indiana Fever in exchange for a 2018 third-round draft pick.

Personal life
Gwathmey is of Puerto Rican descent due to her mother's side of the family. Because of it, she is eligible to play for the Puerto Rican national team.

International career
On 23 June 2017, Gwathmey was included in the Puerto Rican preliminary roster for the 2017 Centrobasket Women.

References

External links
WNBA profile

1993 births
Living people
Puerto Rican women's basketball players
American women's basketball players
American people of Puerto Rican descent
Basketball players at the 2019 Pan American Games
Basketball players at the 2020 Summer Olympics
Basketball players from Virginia
Central American and Caribbean Games bronze medalists for Puerto Rico
Competitors at the 2018 Central American and Caribbean Games
Indiana Fever players
James Madison Dukes women's basketball players
Minnesota Lynx draft picks
Olympic basketball players of Puerto Rico
Pan American Games bronze medalists for Puerto Rico
Pan American Games medalists in basketball
People from Fauquier County, Virginia
Puerto Rican expatriate basketball people in Australia
Puerto Rican expatriate basketball people in South Korea
Puerto Rican expatriate basketball people in Spain
San Antonio Stars players
Shooting guards
Central American and Caribbean Games medalists in basketball
Medalists at the 2019 Pan American Games
United States women's national basketball team players
21st-century Puerto Rican women